Damiano's Lute is a fantasy novel by R. A. MacAvoy published in 1984.

Plot summary
Damiano's Lute is a novel in which former mage Damiano tries to survive as he wanders through plague-ridden Renaissance Italy.

Reception
Dave Langford reviewed Damiano's Lute for White Dwarf #70, and stated that "though it reads well, the characters seem thinner, flatter, less convincing this time around. That's the trouble with writing well, Ms MacAvoy - the blasted critics expect you to write even better."

Reviews
Review by Faren Miller (1984) in Locus, #278 March 1984
Review by Lynn F. Williams (1984) in Fantasy Review, June 1984
Review by Tom Easton (1984) in Analog Science Fiction/Science Fact, September 1984
Review by Mike Christie (1984) in Foundation, #32 November 1984
Review by Helen McNabb (1985) in Vector 128

References

1984 American novels